Knoxville is an unincorporated community in Knox County, Nebraska, United States.

History
A post office was established at Knoxville in 1879, and remained in operation until it discontinued in 1931. An early settler being a native of Knoxville, Illinois caused the name to be selected.

References

Unincorporated communities in Knox County, Nebraska
Unincorporated communities in Nebraska